This is a list of French television related events from 1985.

Events
31 March - Roger Bens is selected to represent France at the 1985 Eurovision Song Contest with his song "Femme dans ses rêves aussi". He is selected to be the twenty-eighth French Eurovision entry during a national final.

Debuts

Television shows

1940s
Le Jour du Seigneur (1949–present)

1950s
Présence protestante (1955-)

1960s
Les Dossiers de l'écran (1967-1991)
Les Animaux du monde (1969-1990)
Alain Decaux raconte (1969-1987)

1970s
30 millions d'amis (1976-2016)
Les Jeux de 20 Heures (1976-1987)

1980s
Dimanche Martin
Julien Fontanes, magistrat (1980-1989)
Mardi Cinéma  (1982-1988)

Ending this year

Births
26 July - Guillaume Pley, TV & radio presenter

Deaths

See also
1985 in France
List of French films of 1985